Haplocochlias cyclophoreus is a species of sea snail, a marine gastropod mollusk in the family Skeneidae.

Description
The diameter of the shell is 5 mm. The compact, small, solid, shining shell has a whitish or light yellowish color. It contains 5 whorls that enlarge. The suture is impressed. The shell is very minutely spirally striate. The aperture is rounded. The thickened peristome is continuous. and varicose exteriorly. The inner lips aredistinct. The shell is umbilicated in the juvenile, but rimate in the adult.

Description
This species occurs in the Pacific Ocean off Lower California.

References

External links
 To USNM Invertebrate Zoology Mollusca Collection
 To World Register of Marine Species
 

cyclophoreus
Gastropods described in 1864